This is a list of current further education colleges that are publicly funded by the Education and Skills Funding Agency in England. The government considers colleges of the further education sector to be: "general FE (GFE) and tertiary colleges, sixth form (6F) colleges, specialist colleges (e.g. colleges of agriculture, or drama) and adult education institutes."

With a substantial number of mergers, and the foundation of many new institutions, this list is inevitably going to be incomplete or include colleges that have since merged to form new institutions, such as Hackney Community College, Tower Hamlets College, and Redbridge College now being titled New City College.

A
 Abbeygate Sixth Form College
 Abingdon and Witney College
 Access Creative College
 Accrington and Rossendale College
 Activate Learning (See Banbury & Bicester College, Bracknell & Wokingham College, City of Oxford College, and Reading College)
 Ada College (National College for Digital Skills)
 Alton College
 Andover College
 Aquinas College
 Ashford College
 Ashton Sixth Form College
 Askham Bryan College

B
 Barking and Dagenham College
 Barnet & Southgate College
 Barnfield College
 Barnsley College
 Barnsley Sixth Form College
 Barton Peveril College
 Basingstoke College of Technology
 Bath College
 Bedford College
 Bedford Sixth Form College
 Berkshire College of Agriculture
 Bexhill College
 Bicton College
 Bilborough College
 Birkenhead Sixth Form College
 Birmingham Metropolitan College
 Bishop Auckland College
 Bishop Burton College
 Blackburn College
 Blackpool & The Fylde College
 Blackpool Sixth Form College
 Bolton College
 Bolton Sixth Form College
 Boston College
 Bournemouth and Poole College
 Bradford College
 Braintree Sixth Form College
 Bridgwater & Taunton College
 Brighton Hove & Sussex Sixth Form College
 Brockenhurst College
 Brooke House Sixth Form College
 Brooklands College
 Brooksby Melton College
 Buckinghamshire College Group (See Aylesbury College and Amersham & Wycombe College)
 Burnley College
 Burton & South Derbyshire College
 Bury College
 Buxton & Leek College

C
 Cadbury Sixth Form College
 Calderdale College
 Callywith College
 Cambridge Regional College
 Canterbury College
 Capel Manor College
 Cardinal Newman College
 Carlisle College
 Carmel College
 Carshalton College
 Central Bedfordshire College
 Cheadle and Marple Sixth Form College
 Chelmsford College
 Cheshire College – South & West 
 Chesterfield College
 Chichester College
 Christ The King Sixth Form College
 Cirencester College
 City and Islington College
 City College Norwich
 City College Peterborough
 City College Plymouth
 City College Southampton
 City Literary Institute
 City of Bristol College
 City of Oxford College
 City of Stoke-on-Trent Sixth Form College
 City of Westminster College
 City of Wolverhampton College
 Clarendon Sixth Form College
 Cleveland College of Art And Design
 Colchester Institute
 Colchester Sixth Form College
 College of Animal Welfare
 College of Haringey, Enfield and North East London
 College of North West London
 College of Richard Collyer
 College of West Anglia
 Connell Sixth Form College
 Cornwall College
 The Coopers Company and Coborn School
 Coulsdon College
 Coventry College (See City College Coventry and Henley College)
 Craven College
 Crawley College
 Cronton Sixth Form College
 Croydon College

D
 Darlington College
 Dearne Valley College
 Derby College
 Dereham Sixth Form College
 Derwentside College
 Doncaster College
 Duchy College
 Dudley College of Technology
 Durham Sixth Form Centre

E
 East Coast College
 East Durham College
 East Kent College
 East Norfolk Sixth Form College
 East Riding College
 East Surrey College
 East Sussex College
 East Sussex College Hastings
 Eastleigh College
 Easton College
 Elliott Hudson College
 Esher College
 Exeter College

F
 Falmouth Marine School
 Fareham College
 Farnborough College of Technology
 Farnborough Sixth Form College
 Farnham Sixth Form College
 Fashion Retail Academy
 Fircroft College
 Franklin College
 Furness College

G
 Gateshead College
 Gateway Sixth Form College
 Gloucestershire College
 Godalming College
 Goole College
 Grantham College
 Greater Brighton Metropolitan College
 Greenhead College
 Grimsby Institute
 Guildford College

H
 Hadlow College
 Halesowen College
 Haringey Sixth Form College
 Harlow College
 Harrogate College
 Harrow College
 Hartlepool College of Further Education
 Hartlepool Sixth Form College
 Hartpury College
 Havant and South Downs College (See Havant College and South Downs College)
 Havering College of Further and Higher Education
 Havering Sixth Form College
 Heart of Worcestershire College
 Henley College
 Hereford College of Arts
 Herefordshire and Ludlow College
 Hereford Sixth Form College
 Hereward College
 Hertford Regional College
 Highbury College
 Hillcroft College
 Hills Road Sixth Form College
 Holy Cross College
 Hopwood Hall College
 Huddersfield New College
 Hugh Baird College
 Hull College

I
 Isle of Wight College
 Itchen College

J
 John Leggott College
 John Ruskin College
 Joseph Chamberlain Sixth Form College

K
 Kendal College
 Kensington and Chelsea College
 Kidderminster College
 King Edward VI College, Nuneaton
 King Edward VI College, Stourbridge
 King George V College
 Kingston College
 Kingston Maurward College
 Kirklees College
 Knowsley Community College

L
 Lakes College
 Lambeth College
 Lancaster and Morecambe College
 Leeds City College
 Leeds College of Building
 Leicester College
 Lewisham Southwark College
 Leyton Sixth Form College
 Lincoln College
 London College of Beauty Therapy
 London South East Colleges (See Bexley College, Bromley College and Greenwich Community College)
 Long Road Sixth Form College
 Longley Park Sixth Form
 Loreto College
 Loughborough College
 Lowestoft Sixth Form College
 Ludlow College
 Luton Sixth Form College

M
 Macclesfield College
 Manchester College (The)
 Marine Society College
 Mary Ward Centre
 Merton College Previously part of South Thames College
 Middlesbrough College
 MidKent College
 Milton Keynes College
 Moorlands Sixth Form College
 Morley College
 Moulton College
 Myerscough College

N
 National College Creative Industries
 National College for High Speed Rail
 National College for Nuclear
 National Extension College
 Nelson and Colne College
 New City College (See Epping Forest College, Hackney Community College, Redbridge College and Tower Hamlets College)
 New College Bradford
 New College Doncaster
 New College Durham
 New College, Pontefract
 New College Swindon
 Newbury College
 Newcastle College
 Newcastle Sixth Form College
 Newcastle-under-Lyme College
 Newham College of Further Education
 Newham Sixth Form College
 North East Surrey College of Technology
 North Hertfordshire College
 North Lindsey College
 North Nottinghamshire College
 North Shropshire College
 North Warwickshire and South Leicestershire College (See North Warwickshire and Hinckley College & South Leicestershire College)
 North West Kent College
 Northampton College
 Northbrook Metropolitan College
 Northern College
 Northumberland College
 Notre Dame Catholic Sixth Form College
 Nottingham College (See Central College Nottingham and New College Nottingham)

O
 Oaklands College
 Oldham College
 Oldham Sixth Form College

P
 Padworth College
 Palmer's College
 Paston College
 Peter Symonds College
 Peterborough College
 Petroc College
 Plumpton College
 Plymouth College of Art and Design
 Portland College
 Portsmouth College
 Preston's College
 Priestley College
 Prior Pursglove College
 Prospects College of Advanced Technology

Q
 Queen Alexandra College
 Queen Alexandra Sixth Form College
 Queen Elizabeth Sixth Form College
 Queen Mary's College

R
 Reading College
 Reaseheath College
 Redbridge Institute
 Redcar and Cleveland College
 Reigate College
 Richard Huish College
 Richard Taunton Sixth Form College
 Richmond and Hillcroft Adult Community College
 Richmond Upon Thames College
 Riseholme College
 Riverside College
 Rochdale Sixth Form College
 Rotherham College of Arts and Technology
 Royal National College for the Blind
 Runshaw College
 Ruskin College

S
 Saint Brendan's Sixth Form College
 Saint Charles Catholic Sixth Form College
 Saint Dominic's Sixth Form College
 Saint Francis Xavier Sixth Form College
 Saint Helens College
 Saint John Rigby College
 Saint Mary's College
 Saint Vincent College
 Salford City College
 Salisbury Sixth Form College
 Sandwell College
 Scarborough Sixth Form College
 Scarborough TEC (Previously Yorkshire Coast College and now part of the Grimsby Institute of Further & Higher Education))
 Seevic College
 Selby College
 Sheffield College (The)
 Shipley College
 Shooters Hill Sixth Form College
 Shrewsbury College
 Shrewsbury Sixth Form College
 Shuttleworth College
 Sir George Monoux College
 Sir John Deane's College
 Skegness TEC (formally Lincolnshire Regional College and now part of the Grimsby Institute of Further & Higher Education)
 Solihull College
 Solihull Sixth Form College
 South and City College Birmingham
 South Devon College
 South Essex College
 South Gloucestershire and Stroud College
 South Staffordshire College
 South Thames College
 South Tyneside College
 Southport College
 Sparsholt College
 Stafford College
 Stamford College
 Stanmore College
 Stephenson College
 Stockport College
 Stockton Riverside College
 Stockton Sixth Form College
 Stoke-on-Trent College
 Stratford-upon-Avon College
 Strode College
 Strode's College
 Suffolk New College
 Suffolk One Sixth Form College
 Sunderland College
 Sutton College
 Swindon College

T
 Tameside College
 Telford College of Arts and Technology
 Thomas Rotherham College
 Totton College
 Trafford College
 Tresham College of Further and Higher Education
 Truro and Penwith College
 Tunnelling & Underground Construction Academy
 Tyne Metropolitan College

U
 University College Birmingham
 UTC South Durham
 Uxbridge College

V
 Varndean College

W
 Wakefield College
 Walsall College
 Waltham Forest College
 Warrington and Vale Royal College (See Mid Cheshire College and Warrington Collegiate)
 Warwickshire College Group (See Warwickshire College & Malvern Hills College)
 Welbeck Defence Sixth Form College
 West Herts College
 West Kent College
 West London College
 West Lancashire College
 West Nottinghamshire College
 West Suffolk College
 West Thames College
 Westminster Kingsway College
 Weston College
 Weymouth College
 Wigan and Leigh College
 Wilberforce College
 William Morris Sixth Form College
 Wiltshire College
 Windsor Forest Colleges Group (See East Berkshire College, Langley College, Strode's College and Windsor College)
 Winstanley College
 Wirral Metropolitan College
 Woking College
 Woodhouse College
 Worcester Sixth Form College
 Working Men's College
 Worthing College
 Writtle University College
 Wyggeston and Queen Elizabeth I College (See Regent College)
 Wyke College

X
 Xaverian College

Y
 Yeovil College
 York College

Gallery

See also
List of further education colleges in Northern Ireland
List of further education colleges in Scotland
List of further education colleges in Wales

References

England education-related lists